Joaquim Pijoan (Santa Cristina d'Aro, Baix Empordà, 27 March 1948) is a Spanish painter and writer from Catalonia.

His published works are Somni (1983), Sayonara Barcelona (2007) and Amor a Venècia (2007). He considers painting as his passion, but he has become famous by two literary awards: the Documenta (1982) by Somni and, especially, the Premi Sant Jordi de novel·la (2006) for his work Sayonara Barcelona. The only material published between this two dates was in Revista de Girona.

Sayonara Barcelona 
Sayonara Barcelona, his second novel has been published in 2007. He received the Premi Sant Jordi de novel·la given by Òmnium Cultural in 2006.

Plot 
Abraham is a painter who left Barcelona twenty-five years ago, without telling anyone, leaving behind many people, especially a pregnant girl, and now he is returning from Japan, where he has been living, to say goodbye to the city and its past and not come back ever again. Abraham understands that everything on this trip has changed too, even himself, completely tied to Japanese culture and not to the West, the friends and especially the city, which has become a thematic park where it is very difficult to hear someone speaking Catalan.

The most interesting of all is how this novel is written, first with narrator in third person who observes his characters, so that even as we find him as a character in the novel, as a private detective who follows them and at one point explains us the reason for writing this text. We also find sentences in first person with the characters narrating their views. These effects give great polyphony in the novel and they are a resource of great interest.

Notes

Bibliography

External links 
 Web page of Night of Santa Llúcia 

Living people
Writers from Catalonia
Painters from Catalonia
1948 births
Catalan-language writers